Robert Aime Maheu (October 30, 1917 – August 4, 2008) was an American businessman and lawyer, who worked for the FBI and CIA, and as the chief executive of Nevada operations for the industrialist Howard Hughes.

Early life
Maheu was born in Waterville, Maine, the son of Christine and Ephrem Maheu, who were of French-Canadian descent. He held degrees from Holy Cross and Georgetown University. In 1941, during his law studies at Georgetown, he was hired by the FBI and worked as a counter-intelligence officer in Europe during World War II. He left the FBI in 1947 and opened Robert A. Maheu and Associates, a private detective firm in Washington, DC.

Howard Hughes
Maheu's contract with the Hughes company started in 1955, after Howard Hughes hired him to investigate an alleged suitor of his fiancé Jean Peters.

Although Maheu was for years a close confidant of Howard Hughes, he never met Hughes face-to-face, as they worked via memo and telephone. He was dismissed in 1970. As part of the power struggle with Frank William Gay, Hughes “Mormon Mafia” chief,  to get rid of Maheu, Hughes wrote a manuscript letter to Chester Davis and Bill Gay which was published in facsimile by Life in January 1971; this publication provided Clifford Irving with a sample of Hughes' handwriting which he later used to attempt to forge Hughes' autobiography. Maheu sued Hughes for defamation of character for $50 million.

In the conference call on January 7, 1972 in which he denounced Irving's supposed autobiography of him as a hoax, Hughes was also asked why he fired Maheu, to which he replied:

Hughes was asked later in the conference call how he felt about Maheu, to which he replied:

As a result of the first set of statements by Hughes, Maheu sued the Hughes Tool Company (which had Hughes as its sole owner) once again, this time for libel; he won the suit, and was paid $2.8 million. However, this settlement was later overturned upon appeal.

According to Maheu associate John Gerrity, he and Maheu were summoned to Vice President Richard Nixon's office in 1954 at the behest of the National Security Council. Nixon gave Maheu a green light to employ a series of dirty tricks to wreck a pending agreement between Greek shipping magnate Aristotle Onassis and the king of Saudi Arabia.

Central Intelligence Agency
Maheu also worked for the Central Intelligence Agency. He would later recall: "The CIA was my first steady client, giving me 'cut-out' assignments [those jobs in which the Agency could not officially be involved]." Maheu's investigative agency was said to be the model for the television series, Mission Impossible.

In the summer of 1960, the CIA recruited Maheu to approach the West Coast representative of the Chicago mob, Johnny Roselli. When Maheu contacted Roselli, Maheu hid the fact that he was sent by the CIA, instead portraying himself an advocate for international corporations. He offered to pay $150,000 to have Castro killed, but Roselli declined any pay. Roselli introduced Maheu to two men he referred to as "Sam Gold" and "Joe." "Sam Gold" was Sam Giancana; "Joe" was Santo Trafficante, Jr., the Tampa, Florida boss and one of the most powerful mobsters in pre-revolution Cuba. Glenn Kessler of The Washington Post explained: "After Fidel Castro led a revolution that toppled a friendly government in 1959, the CIA was desperate to eliminate him. So the agency sought out a partner equally worried about Castro—the Mafia, which had lucrative investments in Cuban casinos."

In testimony before the Church Committee in 1975, Maheu confirmed his role in the assassination plot against Castro, saying that he thought the United States "was involved in a just war." CIA documents released in 2007 provided additional details of the plot.

Later life
In 1992, Maheu published his autobiography, entitled Next to Hughes: Behind the Power and Tragic Downfall of Howard Hughes by His Closest Advisor. Maheu died in 2008 at the age of 90 in Las Vegas. The official cause of death was heart failure.

See also
 638 Ways to Kill Castro, a 2006 television documentary
 Assassination attempts on Fidel Castro
 Spooks: The Haunting of America: the private use of secret agents, by Jim Hougan, 1978, William Morrow, .

References

Further reading
Maheu, Robert with Richard Hack. Next to Hughes: Behind the Power and Tragic Downfall of Howard Hughes by His Closest Advisor. New York, HarperCollins, 1992.
Higham, Charles. Howard Hughes: The Secret Life. New York, G.P. Putnam's Sons, 1993 and 2004.
Drosnin, Michael. Citizen Hughes: In his Own Words, How Howard Hughes Tried to Buy America. Portland, Oregon: Broadway Books, 2004. .

External links
How the CIA Enlisted the Chicago Mob to Put a Hit on Castro
Interview with Robert Maheu NPR transcript.
Robert Maheu's obituary

1917 births
2008 deaths
20th-century American businesspeople
20th-century American memoirists
College of the Holy Cross alumni
Contractees of the Central Intelligence Agency
Federal Bureau of Investigation agents
Georgetown University alumni